The Prophecies of Malachi refer to two very different works:

 The one most often meant is a list of prophecies on the reigns of the Popes, apparently by a medieval Irish monk Malachi, possibly the same as St. Malachi
 The Biblical Book of Malachi may also be meant